Sir David Monro (27 March 1813 – 15 February 1877) was a New Zealand politician. He served as Speaker of the New Zealand House of Representatives from 1861 to 1870.

Early life
Monro was born in Edinburgh. His father was Alexander Monro, a lecturer at the Edinburgh Medical College. Monro was from a long line of doctors, the Monro of Fyrish family that was a branch of clan Munro. He graduated as a Doctor of Medicine from his father's college in 1835. After first studying for a time in Paris, Berlin and Vienna, Monro established a medical practice in Edinburgh. In 1841, however, Monro bought land in the planned settlement at Nelson, New Zealand. He arrived in Nelson the following year.

Monro married Dinah Secker on 7 May 1845 and they had five sons and two daughters, including Charles Monro, who introduced rugby union to New Zealand, and Maria Georgiana Monro, who married the Scottish geologist, naturalist, and surgeon James Hector.

Political career
In 1843, following the Wairau Affray, Monro was chosen (along with Alfred Domett, later to become Premier) to present the Nelson settlers' views to Willoughby Shortland, the acting Governor. Partly as a result of this attention, Monro was appointed to the Legislative Council of the New Munster Province in 1849, but resigned after a dispute with Governor George Grey.

In 1853, Monro was elected to the 1st New Zealand Parliament, representing the seat of Waimea. He was re-elected in the same seat for the 2nd Parliament in 1858. At the beginning of the 3rd Parliament, to which Monro had been elected as representative of Picton, he was selected as Speaker. He is generally regarded as having conducted this duty "with dignity", although his use of the Speaker's casting vote to unseat Premier William Fox in 1862 was controversial. At the 1866 general election, he successfully contested the Cheviot electorate and declared elected unopposed. Monro remained Speaker until 1870, when he announced that he would step down. William Fox, who was once again Premier, failed to move the traditional vote of thanks.

Monro contested the Motueka seat in the 1871 elections, and was declared elected. A subsequent petition, however, overturned this result. The committee that made the ruling had a government majority, and some of its findings have been deemed "legally dubious" – many believe that the decision was taken for political reasons. Furthermore, a proposal to appoint Monro to the Legislative Council was blocked by Fox. Monro nevertheless succeeded in re-entering Parliament through a 1872 by-election in Waikouaiti. After the Fox government had been defeated, Monro resigned in 1873.

Life outside politics

For some time, Monro leased Warwick House, at the time known as Sunnyside. The house was built for Arthur Fell (father of Charles Fell) in 1854 by builder David Goodall.  When Fell returned to England, Monro leased the house. Later, the house was bought by Nathaniel Edwards. The building at 64 Brougham Street in Nelson is one of the finest and largest examples of early Victorian Gothic Revivalism still remaining in New Zealand.  At one time, the house had about 50 rooms. The building was registered on 25 November 1982 as Category II with Heritage New Zealand, with registration number 1618.

Monro was knighted in 1866. He died at his home, Newstead (now known as Renwick House), in Nelson, New Zealand, on 15 February 1877.

The perennial herb endemic to New Zealand Myosotis monroi is named after him.

See also
Munro of Auchinbowie, the distinguished Scottish family that David Monro was descended from.

References

Sources

 
"The Monros of Auchinbowie and Cognate Families". By John Alexander Inglis. Edinburgh. Printed privately by T and A Constable. Printers to His Majesty. 1911.

|-

1813 births
1877 deaths
Members of the New Zealand House of Representatives
Speakers of the New Zealand House of Representatives
Members of the Nelson Provincial Council
Politicians from Edinburgh
New Zealand Knights Bachelor
19th-century New Zealand medical doctors
New Zealand MPs for South Island electorates
Alumni of the University of Edinburgh
19th-century Scottish medical doctors
19th-century Scottish people
Scottish emigrants to New Zealand
Unsuccessful candidates in the 1871 New Zealand general election
David
New Zealand politicians awarded knighthoods